Arthur Mayo is the name of:
Arthur Mayo (VC) (1840–1920), English Naval Officer and recipient of the Victoria Cross
Arthur Mayo (politician) (1936–2015), American politician

See also
Arthur Mayo-Robson (1853–1933), English surgeon